Sharon Cintron (born January 16, 1945 in Perth Amboy, New Jersey) is an American model and actress. She was Playboy magazine's Playmate of the Month for its May 1963 issue. Her centerfold was photographed by Mario Casilli. She later held a recurring role on the TV series Baretta.

Filmography

Films
 How Sweet It Is! (1968) .... Agatzi Girl

Television
 "Kaz"- "A Little Shuck and a Whole Lotta Jive" (1978-09-10)
 "Baretta"
 "Woman Trouble" (1978-03-23) .... Mimi
 "Just for Laughs" (1978-02-09) .... Mimi
 "New Girl in Town" (1977-09-28) .... Mimi
 "Everybody Pays the Fare" (1977-02-23) .... Mimi
 "Don't Kill the Sparrow" (1977-01-12) .... Mimi
 "Can't Win for Losin'" (1976-12-15) .... Mimi
 "Shoes" (1976-10-27) .... Mimi
 "They Don't Make 'Em Like They Used To" (1976-10-20) .... Mimi
 "Runaway Cowboy" (1976-10-06) - Mimi
 "Dead Man Out" (1976-03-03) - Mimi
 "The Blood Bond" (1976-02-18) - Mimi
 "Murder for Me" (1976-01-14) - Mimi
 "When Dues Come Down" (1975-11-12) - Mimi
 "The Fire Man" (1975-10-08) - Mimi
 "The Secret of Terry Lake" (1975-04-16) - Mimi
 "Quincy"
 "Snake Eyes: Part 1" (1977) .... Stormy
 "Snake Eyes: Part 2" (1977) .... Stormy
 "The Blue Knight" - "A Slight Case of Murder" (1976) .... Hooker
 "The Rockford Files" - "The No-Cut Contract" (1976) .... Sharon
 Aloha Means Goodbye (1974) (TV movie).... File Nurse
 The Chadwick Family (1974) (TV movie) .... Nurse
 Evil Roy Slade (1972) (uncredited) (TV movie) .... Young Woman kissed by Evil Roy while robbing bank
 "Mannix" - "Bang, Bang, You're Dead" (1970) .... Miss Parks
 "The Wild Wild West"
 "The Night of the Avaricious Actuary" (1968) .... Girl #1
 "The Night of the Cutthroats" (1967) .... Waiting Lady
 "The Night of the Circus of Death" (1967) .... Secretary
 "Get Smart" - "With Love and Twitches (1968) .... Waitress
 "The Monkees" - "Some Like It Lukewarm" (1968) .... Maxine
 "Burke's Law" - "Who Killed Molly?" (1964) .... 1st Stripper

Quote 
"I want to be a hair stylist because I like styling hair. And the money is good. Why try to be a starlet and starve?"

See also
 List of people in Playboy 1960–1969

References

External links 
 
 

1945 births
1960s Playboy Playmates
Living people
People from Perth Amboy, New Jersey